The Hiester family was a German American political and military dynasty.

Noted members of the family include:

John Hiester (1745-1821) US Congressman
Daniel Hiester (1747-1804) US Congressman
Gabriel Hiester (1749-1824) Pennsylvania political leader
Joseph Hiester (1752-1832) US Congressman and Governor of Pennsylvania
Daniel Hiester the younger (1774-1834) US Congressman
William Hiester (1790-1853) US Congressman
William Muhlenberg Hiester (1818-1878) Pennsylvania political leader
Isaac Ellmaker Hiester (1824-1871) US Congressman
Hiester Clymer (1827-1884) US Congressman

In addition, The Hiesters were related to the Muhlenberg family. Some notable members include:

Henry Muhlenberg (1711-1787) Founder of the Lutheran Church in America
Peter Muhlenberg (1746-1807) Minister, Continental Army General, US Congressman, US Senator
Frederick Muhlenberg (1750-1801) Member of Continental Congress, Speaker of US House of Representatives
John Andrew Shulze (1774-1852) Governor of Pennsylvania
Henry A. P. Muhlenberg (1782-1844) US Congressman and Minister to Austria
Francis Swaine Muhlenberg (1795-1831) US Congressman
Henry Augustus Muhlenberg (1823-1854) US Congressman
Frederick Augustus Muhlenberg (1887-1980) US Congressman and World War I and World War II soldier

References

 
American families of German ancestry
Political families of the United States
German-American history